"Little Honda" is a song by the American rock band the Beach Boys from their 1964 album All Summer Long. Written by Brian Wilson and Mike Love, it pays tribute to the small Honda motorcycle and its ease of operation, specifically the Honda 50.

Immediately following its appearance on All Summer Long, the song was covered by The Hondells, whose recording produced by Gary Usher peaked at No. 9 on the U.S. Billboard 100.

Recording
In a 1976 interview, Carl Wilson recounted an anecdote about "Little Honda",

Personnel 
Per Craig Slowinski.

The Beach Boys
Al Jardine – backing vocals, electric rhythm guitars, electric bass guitar
Mike Love – lead vocal
Brian Wilson – backing vocals, upright or grand piano, Hammond B3 organ
Carl Wilson – backing vocals, electric lead guitars, electric rhythm guitars
Dennis Wilson – opening voice, backing vocals, drums

Additional musicians and production staff
Brian Wilson – arranger, producer
Chuck Britz – engineer
Ray Pohlman – 6-string electric bass guitars

Charts
Beach Boys

Covers 

1964 – The Hondells, single "Little Honda"
1965 – Jan & Dean, Command Performance
1973 – Dove, single "Little Honda"
1974 – The Carpenters, ‘’Live In Japan’’ (Live concert recording)
1996 – The Queers, Bubblegum Dreams 7", Lookout!
1997 – Yo La Tengo, I Can Hear the Heart Beating as One
2003 – Travoltas, Party!

References 

1964 songs
Honda
The Beach Boys songs
Jan and Dean songs
Songs written by Brian Wilson
Songs written by Mike Love
Song recordings produced by Brian Wilson
Songs about transport
Number-one singles in Sweden
American pop rock songs